Bahadir Öztürk (born 1 October 1995) is a Turkish footballer who plays as a defender for TFF First League club Çaykur Rizespor on loan from Antalyaspor.

Career
A youth product of Antalyaspor, Öztürk spent his early career on loan with various clubs in the lower divisions of Turkey. Öztürk made his professional debut for Antalyaspor in a 3-2 Süper Lig win over Beşiktaş JK on 26 August 2018.

References

External links
 Soccerway Profile
 TFF Profile
 Mackolik Profile

1995 births
Living people
People from Gaziosmanpaşa
Turkish footballers
Association football defenders
Antalyaspor footballers
Şanlıurfaspor footballers
Elazığspor footballers
Süper Lig players
TFF First League players
TFF Second League players